Bostaera is a genus of delphacid planthoppers in the family Delphacidae. There are about five described species in Bostaera.

Species
These five species belong to the genus Bostaera:
 Bostaera balli Penner, 1952
 Bostaera bolivari (Melichar, 1901)
 Bostaera frontalis Lindberg, 1958
 Bostaera gomerense Carl, 1995
 Bostaera nasuta Ball, 1902

References

Further reading

 
 
 
 

Delphacinae
Articles created by Qbugbot
Auchenorrhyncha genera